Nicola Ann Juniper (born 12 August 1981) is a British racing cyclist, directeur sportif and former team owner. She rode in the women's road race at the 2019 UCI Road World Championships in Yorkshire, England. In 2015, Juniper won the British National Circuit Race Championships in Barnsley.

Major results

2009
 6th Smithfield Nocturne
2010
 3rd Smithfield Nocturne
2011
 7th Smithfield Nocturne
2012
 6th London Nocturne
2014
 1st London Nocturne
 9th RideLondon Grand Prix
2015
 1st  Criterium, National Road Championships
 1st Sprints classification Matrix Fitness GP Series
 3rd London Nocturne
 7th Overall Rás na mBan
 9th Women's Tour de Yorkshire
2016
 2nd London Nocturne
 3rd Criterium, National Road Championships
 8th Women's Tour de Yorkshire
2018
 Tour Series
1st  Sprints classification
1st Aberdeen
1st Durham
1st Salisbury
 2nd Overall Rás na mBan

References

External links
 

1981 births
Living people
British female cyclists
Place of birth missing (living people)